Game Shakers is an American comedy television series created by Dan Schneider that premiered on Nickelodeon on September 12, 2015. The series ran for three seasons, with its final episode airing on June 8, 2019. It stars Cree Cicchino, Madisyn Shipman, Benjamin "Lil' P-Nut" Flores, Jr., Thomas Kuc, and Kel Mitchell.

Series overview

Episodes

Season 1 (2015–16)

Season 2 (2016–17)

Season 3 (2018–19)

References 

Lists of American children's television series episodes
Lists of American comedy television series episodes
Lists of Nickelodeon television series episodes